AIDS Healthcare Foundation (AHF) is a Los Angeles-based 501(c)(3) nonprofit organization providing medicine and health care to individuals living with or affected by HIV/AIDS. As of 2022, it operates about 400 clinics, 64 outpatient healthcare centers, 48 pharmacies, and 20 Out of the Closet thrift stores across 15 US states and 45 countries, with more than 5,000 employees, and provides care to more than 1.7 million patients.

Under the leadership of founder and president Michael Weinstein, AHF has since 2012 become highly active in sponsoring and exclusively financing multiple high profile ballot initiatives in two states, starting with a successful Los Angeles County initiative to require condoms in adult films (Measure B), and then a similar statewide initiative which failed (2016 California Proposition 60).  They also ran two measures seeking to cap prescription drug prices (California Proposition 61 (2016) and Ohio Issue 2 (2017)), both of which failed.

Since 2017, the organization has shifted its political focus to attempting to block housing construction through lawsuits against many new projects, as well as an initiative seeking to block local development in Los Angeles (2017 Los Angeles Measure S), and two seeking to allow for the expansion of rent control in California (2018 California Proposition 10 and 2020 California Proposition 21); these three failed at the polls. Regarding the housing initiatives, critics have questioned whether the group is misusing foundation and taxpayer money by sponsoring ballot initiatives they consider unrelated to the stated mission of the organization.

History

Early years: AIDS Hospice Foundation and Chris Brownlie Hospice 

In 1987, activists Chris Brownlie, Michael Weinstein, Sharon Raphael, PhD, Mina Meyer, MA, and other advocates were among the earliest champions of the AIDS hospice movement. They co-founded the Los Angeles AIDS Hospice Committee, which was the catalyst for the AIDS Hospice Foundation that we know today as the AIDS Healthcare Foundation.

Members of the inaugural AIDS Hospice Committee—Brownlie, Weinstein, Myer, Raphael, Paul Coleman and others—negotiated for the opening of Chris Brownlie Hospice by protesting and picketing of then-Supervisor Mike Antonovich's home. Following an emotional plea for hospice care to Los Angeles County Commission on AIDS, which included the Los Angeles County Board of Supervisors, they secured a $2 million commitment to AIDS care on the grounds of the Barlow Respiratory Hospital.

The group began converting a facility in Elysian Park that had been Barlow's old nursing quarters into Chris Brownlie Hospice —the County's first AIDS hospice—which was named in Brownlie's honor when it first opened December 26, 1988. Meyer, who also served as Treasurer of the AIDS Hospice Committee, was honored in 1987 by the Los Angeles AIDS Hospice Committee with its 'Heart of Gold Award' for her early work in the effort to formulate AIDS hospice care in Los Angeles.

The 25-bed hospice—the first of three operated by AHF, including the Carl Bean House and Linn House, which opened in 1992 and 1995, respectively—provided 24-hour medical and palliative care to people living through the final stages of AIDS. Brownlie died at the age of 39, on November 26, 1989, less than a year after the hospice named in his honor first opened, survived by his father, sister, brothers, his longtime partner, Phil Wilson and countless friends and fellow AIDS activists.  In addition to Brownlie, over 1,000 people had been given dignified, specialized, compassionate final care at the Chris Brownlie Hospice by the time it ended hospice operations in September 1996. The building that housed the Brownlie Hospice went through its own rebirths, housing various departments of AHF, including the headquarters for AHF's Public Health Division, before the organization officially turned the property back over to the City of Los Angeles with a sunset memorial ceremony on January 26, 2013.

Expansion 
As medical opportunities for managing HIV became more available, AHF changed its mission to helping individuals with HIV/AIDS live well with the disease through advanced medical care. This shift was marked with the change of the Foundation's name to AIDS Healthcare Foundation in July 1990.

AHF operates the Out of the Closet thrift store chain. AHF acquired the MOMS Pharmacy chain of pharmacies in 2012, and in 2013, rebranded the chain as AHF Pharmacy.

AHF sponsored HIV awareness themed Rose Parade floats in 2012 and 2013, each winning the Queen's Trophy for best use of roses.

AHF produced the documentary film Keep The Promise: The Global Fight Against AIDS, depicting the AHF sponsored protest of government anti-HIV funding levels and anti-HIV drug prices at the XIX International AIDS Conference, 2012. The film premiered on March 29, 2013 at the Vail Film Festival.

Housing 

In 2017, AHF started acquiring hotels (often single-room occupancy) in the Los Angeles area for conversion to affordable housing units, renting them for about $400–600 per month.  By 2020, it owned seven such properties totalling 800 units.  As of 2022, it owns over a dozen in Los Angeles, Hollywood, and skid row neighborhoods.

In 2020, tenants in one of the AHF's apartment buildings (an almost century old hotel named The Madison) sued the AHF over slum-like conditions.  The tenants had reached a settlement with the previous owner for similar problems, and allege that the previous owner defrauded AHF by not disclosing that settlement, though others say that AHF should have known from due diligence.

Safer sex advocacy
AHF hosts global events to both commemorate those lost to HIV/AIDS and educate the public about the importance of safer sex with condom use. Each year on December 1, AHF marks World AIDS Day with a series of international events throughout many of the countries where AHF operates. It is an opportunity to reflect on the progress made in battling HIV/AIDS over the years and be a reminder of the work left to be done amid the 1.7 million new HIV infections every year. 

International Condom Day is an AHF holiday celebrated on February 13. It was created to promote safer sex and provide access to condoms and free Rapid Testing. AHF uses World AIDS Day and International Condom Day as fun ways to engage with people, get them tested for HIV, and get them connected to care if they need it.

Advocacy for reducing drug prices

In November 2006, AHF asked Indian anti-HIV drug manufacturer Cipla to reduce the price of its combination drug Viraday from its launch price of about Rs 62,000 per year. Cipla CEO Y. K. Hamied cited taxes and custom duties on raw materials as reasons for the high price, but agreed to a price cut.

In January 2007, AHF filed suit in Los Angeles over Pfizer's direct-to-consumer marketing of Viagra, accusing Pfizer of promoting off-label, recreational use of Viagra, and suggesting a link between Viagra, methamphetamine, and unsafe sex. Pfizer denied AHF's claims, and mentioned that AHF had recently asked Pfizer to fund an educational program about meth.

In August 2007, AHF began purchasing full-page ads in Indian newspapers accusing Cipla of overpricing. According to AHF, a year's worth of Viraday cost Rs 54,000 when sold in India, but only Rs 21,000 when exported to Africa. Some NGOs declined to join AHF in criticizing Cipla's drug prices, citing a potential conflict of interest: Cipla's opposition to the patent application for Viread, a component of Viraday, filed by AHF contributor Gilead Sciences. Gilead denied involvement in AHF's complaint, and an AHF regional chief stated that AHF also opposed Gilead's patent application for Viread. After months of AHF campaigning against Cipla, the company is brought under investigation by the Monopolies and Restrictive Practices Commission (MRTPC) and moves to reduce the price of Viraday and Efavir in India by 15%.

In March 2008, AHF petitioned drug manufacturers including Abbot, Boehringer Ingelheim, Bristol-Myers Squibb, Gilead, GSK, Merck, Pfizer, Roche and Tibotec to freeze the price of their HIV drugs in the U.S, stating that as a result of regular drug price increases "HIV/AIDS assistance programs will essentially be flat funded and unable to provide access to additional people in need of lifesaving drugs." In June, the organization applauded decisions by Boehringer Ingelheim and Gilead Sciences to freeze prices on antiretroviral medications purchased by government agencies.

In September 2013, AHF filed a lawsuit in California against GSK alleging that the company "...failed to fully satisfy its obligations with respect to discounts for drugs it sold to AIDS Healthcare Foundation over a period of many years," under the 340B Drug Pricing Program, a federal drug discount program designed to stretch scarce federal resources as far as possible for community healthcare providers such as AHF.

Legal activism 
In May 1999, AHF filed a lawsuit against the City of Los Angeles over the mismanagement of AIDS Housing Funds.  Following a state legislator's audit, the Los Angeles City Controller revealed that more than $17 million in federal funds for people with AIDS went unspent as an AIDS homeless crisis raged in Los Angeles.

Condom laws litigation in Los Angeles and Las Vegas

In 2004, Darren James and three other adult film actors tested positive for HIV. In response to the outbreak, AHF began lobbying in favor of laws requiring condom use by male actors during sex scenes in adult films.

In 2010, AHF unsuccessfully sued the Los Angeles County government to compel its health department to mandate condom use in adult film productions.

In 2012, AHF supported a Los Angeles city ordinance requiring condoms in certain adult films. Later the same year, the organization spent US$1,654,681 funding the successful campaign to pass Measure B, a ballot initiative that expanded the condom requirement countywide.

AHF again sued the Los Angeles County government, alleging that an August 2012 audit conducted by the county was an illegal retaliation for AHF's support for Measure B. In 2013, AHF began collecting signatures for a ballot measure to create a Los Angeles city health department that would take over part of the county health department's jurisdiction. The City of Los Angeles and County of Los Angeles oppose the measure, and the city has filed a lawsuit seeking to invalidate the measure.

In August 2014, the AIDS Healthcare Foundation filed a formal complaint with Nevada OSHA, against Cybernet Entertainment LLC, which does business as Kink.com and related spin-offs. The complaint alleges the California porn company did not require its actors to use condoms during an adult film shoot in Las Vegas.

2013 Los Angeles lawsuit

In 2013, AHF found itself entangled in dual lawsuits when AHF attempted to use political clout to force the City of Los Angeles to develop health services independent from the county. Health officials in affected departments filed responsive suits, arguing massive wastes would result in a transition or duplication of services.

2014 lawsuits

In 2014, the AIDS Healthcare Foundation filed suit against the City of San Francisco. AHF claimed that city restrictions on chain stores targeted them unfairly when the organization attempted to open a retail store.

In 2014, the AIDS Healthcare Foundation filed suit against the County of Dallas. AHF claimed that the County did not give the agency a fair chance to bid for federal AIDS funding.

In 2014, AHF was audited by Los Angeles county and billed $1.7 million for duplicated services. AHF filed suit, arguing that they were targeted on the basis of their political actions in the 2013 lawsuit. The lawsuit filed by AHF was thrown out by a judge. The billing case was dismissed, finding AHF had not billed the county for $6 million in allowable services with neither the foundation nor the county having to repay funds.

2015 Broward County Court

In 2015, a whistleblower lawsuit was filed by three former AHF managers. The employees allege AHF engaged and even documented kickback processes for positive HIV test results for social workers.

2016 East Baton Rouge lawsuit

In 2016, the AIDS healthcare foundation filed suit against East Baton Rouge Parish in Louisiana, claiming it was discriminated against  in the awarding of healthcare contracts. The suit specifically targeted funds given to longtime-standing local AIDS service organizations such as HIV/AIDS Alliance for Region Two, Family Service of Greater Baton Rouge, and others. The suit was settled with funding left unchanged.

Housing policy

In an interview with The Advocate in 2016, Weinstein stated: "Why isn't there development in South L.A.?  Why isn't there development in Boyle Heights? Why concentrate all this development in Hollywood? You have a [transit line] in the Valley and a [transit line] in South L.A.".

Those and other similar statements have led opponents to characterize Weinstein as a rich NIMBY who opposes development because it would add traffic to his commute and block the views from his office building, rather than because he cares about the plight of poor renters or people with HIV.

Dana Cuff, an urban planning professor at the University of California, Los Angeles stated that Weinstein's housing opposition "is not understandable ... I'd go further than that; it's actually a misuse of their funds. ... They're putting a lot of energy into stopping this project," says Cuff. "If they put that same energy into getting some of this project to be affordable, I would understand [their motivation]. But to just stop it—they couldn't possibly be concerned about affordable housing."

2016 Los Angeles Palladium Development lawsuit

The AIDS Healthcare Foundation (AHF) filed suit against the City of Los Angeles, alleging that the city violated laws and the city charter when it approved the development of two residential towers that are expected to be up to 30 stories tall. The City Council changed existing zoning and height limitations to allow the development, which would be next to AHF's Hollywood headquarters. A spokesperson for the development accused Michael Weinstein of filing the suit to maintain the view from his office. In 2019, the California Supreme Court Refused to hear the case, leaving in place a lower court decision against the foundation.

2022 L.A. City Council Housing Element dispute 
In 2022, the AHF sued to block Los Angeles's Housing Element, which is a new strategy by the L.A. City Council to increase housing supply in L.A. with a goal of producing 500,000 new housing units by 2030, with 200,000 of those being affordable units.

Ballot initiatives

Condom use in adult films

2012 Los Angeles County Measure B "County of Los Angeles Safer Sex In the Adult Film Industry Act" - succeeded 

AHF spent $1.7 million sponsoring an initiative that requires the use of condoms in all vaginal and anal sex scenes in pornography productions filmed in Los Angeles County, California.  It passed 57% – 43%.

2016 California Proposition 60 "Adult Film Condom Requirements" - failed 

AHF spent $5.0 million (almost ten times what the total opposition spent) as the only financial backer of a statewide initiative that would have allowed Cal/OSHA to prosecute an enforcement action anytime a condom is not visible in a pornographic film.  It failed, 54% to 46%.

Drug pricing

2013 San Francisco Proposition D - succeeded 
In 2013 AHF sponsored Proposition D in the City of San Francisco, which required the city to negotiate directly with drug manufacturers and set a city policy to request that state and federal lawmakers create laws that would reduce drug prices.  It passed 80% – 20%.

2016 California Proposition 61 "California Drug Price Relief Act" - failed 

AHF spent $18.7 million as the almost sole supporter of the California Drug Price Relief Act, (the opposition spent $109 million, making this the most expensive ballot measure to date across California and the United States) a statewide 2016 ballot initiative that would have revised California law to require state programs to pay no more for prescription medications than the prices negotiated by the United States Department of Veterans Affairs (notwithstanding any other provision of law and insofar as permissible under federal law), while exempting managed care programs funded through Medi-Cal.  It failed by a 6% margin.

2017 Ohio Issue 2 "Ohio Drug Price Relief Act" - failed 

AHF spend $18 million as the almost exclusive sponsor of the Ohio Drug Price Relief Act (the opposition raised $59 million). According to the Ohio petition language, "The Ohio Drug Price Relief Act would ... require that notwithstanding any other provision of law and in so far as permissible under federal law, the State of Ohio shall not enter into any agreement for the purchase of prescription drugs or agree to pay, directly or indirectly, for prescription drugs, including where the state is the ultimate payer, unless the net cost is the same or less than the lowest price paid for the same drug by the U. S. Department of Veterans Affairs." The initiative lost, 79% – 21%.

Housing

2017 Los Angeles city Measure S "Neighborhood Integrity Initiative" - failed

In 2016, the foundation sponsored and provided more than 95% of the funding ($5.5 million) for an anti-development ballot initiative, Measure S, which was rejected with 70.4% voting against.  This initiative would have imposed a two-year moratorium on spot zoning as well as developments requiring height and density variances and other changes that would, it claimed, prevent the city from gentrifying and growing too fast. "As we work to house patients in L.A., City Hall focuses on approving $3,500 apartments that sit empty," Weinstein wrote in a Los Angeles Times op-ed.  Opponents, who included many advocacy groups for the homeless as well as the city's business community, building trades unions, and developers, said that while the measure addressed some real problems, it went too far and would have not only prevented the construction of new affordable housing but made the city's overall quality of life worse by aggravating an existing housing shortage. They questioned whether the money spent by the AIDS Healthcare Foundation to get the initiative on the ballot was related to the foundation's mission, and suggested that it was motivated by AHF director Michael Weinstein's desire to block a development that would have dominated the view from his office window.

2018 California Proposition 10 "Repeal of Costa-Hawkins Rental Housing Act" - failed

AHF contributed $22.5 million to the campaign for Proposition 10, a ballot initiative which sought to repeal the 1995 Costa-Hawkins Act. The measure would have allowed local governments to adopt rent control on any kind of building. Costa-Hawkins is a state law which disallows local governments (cities and counties) from enacting rent control on buildings constructed after 1995, all single-family homes (regardless of construction date), and disallows laws that keep a property under rent control when tenants change (vacancy control).
The proposition failed, 59% to 41%.

2020 California Proposition 21 "Expands Local Governments’ Authority to Enact Rent Control on Residential Property" - failed

In 2019, the California legislature passed and the governor signed AB 1482, which created a statewide rent cap for the next 10 years. The Tenant Protection Act of 2019 caps annual rent increases at 5% plus regional inflation, pegged to the rental rate as of March 2019.  The new law does not apply to buildings built within the prior 15 years, or to single-family homes (unless owned by corporations or institutional investors) and retains "vacancy decontrol", meaning that rents can increase to market rate between tenants.

In 2020, Michael Weinstein, AHF's founder, sponsored and financed a second ballot initiative to allow more rent control, because he felt that AB 1482 (above) did not provide enough tenant protections, such as limiting rent increases between tenants.

AHF spent $40 million (99.8% of the supporters' funding) in support of Proposition 21 (the opposition spent $85 million). It appeared on the ballot on November 3, 2020 and would have allowed local governments to establish rent control on residential properties that have been occupied for over 15 years. It would also have allowed landlords who own no more than two homes to exempt themselves from such policies, and would also have capped rent increases between tenancies at 15% over three years (vacancy control). Proposition 21 was rejected by 60% of California voters, like Proposition 10 (above) before it.

See also 

 Adult Industry Medical Health Care Foundation
 Performer Availability Screening Services

References

1987 establishments in California
HIV/AIDS organizations in the United States
Non-profit organizations based in Los Angeles
Organizations established in 1987
STDs in the sex industry
501(c)(3) organizations